Akhasheni is a village in Gurjaani Municipality, Kakheti region, Georgia. It is located 8 km north-west of Gurjaani, at an altitude of about 460 m. The population was 2,420 inhabitants in 2014.

Akhasheni is known for the appellation wine of the same name. The village also houses the Akhalsheni Wine Resort hotel constructed  through the Ministry of Economy's Enterprise Georgia project, the Bank of Georgia and European Union financial programs and opened in March 2018.

See also
 Kakheti

References 

Populated places in Gurjaani Municipality
Tiflis Governorate